Franklin Academy may refer to:

Ben Franklin Academy, DeKalb County, Alabama
Franklin Academy (Connecticut), East Haddam, Connecticut
Franklin Academy (Louisiana), a high school in Franklin Parish, Louisiana
Franklin Academy, now Franklin High School, in Reisterstown, Maryland
Franklin Academy, Columbus, Mississippi, in the Columbus Municipal School District
Franklin Academy, a Congregational Church-affiliated secondary school in Franklin, Nebraska
Franklin Academy (New York) in Malone, New York
Franklin Academy (North Carolina), Wake Forest, North Carolina
Franklin Academy, Lancaster, South Carolina; see J. Marion Sims
Ursula Franklin Academy, Toronto, Ontario
The original school that later became the University of Pennsylvania in Philadelphia